"Rising Son" can refer to:

 Rising Son, a 1990 American TV movie starring Brian Dennehy
 Supernatural: Rising Son, a 2008 comic book mini-series based on the TV series Supernatural
 "Rising Son" (song), a 2007 song by Sturm und Drang
 Rising Son, a British rapper featured on the official remix of the 2004 Nas song "Thief's Theme"
 Rising Son Records, Arlo Guthrie's record label
 The Rising Son, an 1873 book by William Wells Brown

See also
 Rising Sons
 Rising Sun (disambiguation)